Elks Stadium is a baseball stadium located in Kelowna, British Columbia. The stadium is home to the Kelowna Falcons of the West Coast League.

References

Sports venues in Kelowna
Baseball venues in British Columbia